Roger Thull (born 22 May 1939) is a former Luxembourgian cyclist. He competed in the individual road race at the 1960 Summer Olympics.

References

External links
 

1939 births
Living people
Luxembourgian male cyclists
Olympic cyclists of Luxembourg
Cyclists at the 1960 Summer Olympics
People from Kayl